= Spirit of Knowledge Charter School =

Location
- 19 Chatham Street; Worcester, Massachusetts 01602; United States
- 42.2634°N 71.8063°W

Information
- Type: Public charter school
- Established: 2010
- Founder: Julia Sigalovsky
- Closed: 2013
- Grades: 7–12
- Website: www.spiritofknowledge.org

Spirit of Knowledge Charter School was a public charter school in Worcester, Massachusetts, United States. The school opened in the Fall of 2010 enrolling 156 students in grades 7–9. Julia Sigalovsky started as the school's Executive Director, but resigned at the end of the first school year in 2011. David Chauvette started as executive director halfway through the following school year (2012). Paula Bailey started as Executive Director at the beginning of the 2012–2013 school year. The charter school had multiple financial problems. After many board meetings, the board of trustees decided to close the troubled school. The school's students had to move out of the school and now are in other schools within the Worcester Public Schools. Investigation still continues for the school, although the school has closed.
